B, also known as Si, Ti, or, in some European countries, H, is the seventh note and the twelfth semitone of the fixed-Do solfège. Its enharmonic equivalents are C (C-flat) and A (A-double sharp).

When calculated in equal temperament with a reference of A above middle C as 440 Hz, the frequency of Middle B (B4) is approximately 493.883 Hz. See pitch (music) for a discussion of historical variations in frequency.

Designation by octave

Scales

Common scales beginning on B
 B major: B C D E F G A B
 B natural minor: B C D E F G A B
 B Harmonic minor: B C D E F G A B
 B Melodic minor ascending: B C D E F G A B
 B melodic minor descending: B A G F E D C B

Diatonic scales
 B Ionian: B C D E F G A B
 B Dorian: B C D E F G A B
 B Phrygian: B C D E F G A B
 B Lydian: B C D E F G A B
 B Mixolydian: B C D E F G A B
 B Aeolian: B C D E F G A B
 B Locrian: B C D E F G A B

Jazz melodic minor
 B Ascending melodic minor: B C D E F G A B
 B Dorian ♭2: B C D E F G A B
 B Lydian augmented: B C D E F G A B
 B Lydian dominant: B C D E F G A B
 B Mixolydian ♭6: B C D E F G A B
 B Locrian ♮2: B C D E F G A B
 B Altered: B C D E F G A B

Variation of meaning by geographical region
The referent of the musical note B varies by location. See  for a discussion on other differences in letter naming of the notes.

In the United States, Canada, Australia, the United Kingdom, the Republic of Ireland, and the Netherlands, as described above, B usually refers to the note a semitone below C, while B-flat refers to the note a whole tone below C.

However, in Germany, Central and Eastern Europe, and Scandinavia, the label B is sometimes used for what, above, is called B-flat, and the note a semitone below C is called H. This makes possible certain spellings which are otherwise impossible, such as the BACH motif and the DSCH motif (the latter of which also uses the "S" name for what in Anglophone would be E-flat).

See also
 Piano key frequencies
 B major
 B minor
 Root (chord)

Musical notes